Hardcore is a 1979 American neo-noir crime-drama film written and directed by Paul Schrader and starring George C. Scott, Peter Boyle, Ilah Davis and Season Hubley. The story concerns a father (Scott) searching for his daughter (Davis), who has vanished only to appear in a pornographic film. Schrader had previously written the screenplay for Martin Scorsese's Taxi Driver, and both films share a theme of exploring an unseen subculture.

Plot
Jake Van Dorn is a prosperous local businessman in Grand Rapids, Michigan, who has strong Calvinist convictions. A single parent, Van Dorn is the father of a seemingly quiet, conservative teenage girl, Kristen, who inexplicably disappears when she goes on a church-sponsored trip to Bellflower, California. Andy Mast, a strange private investigator (PI) from Los Angeles, is then hired to find her, eventually turning up an 8mm stag film of Kristen with two young men.

After Van Dorn views the film, he suspects that his daughter was kidnapped and persuaded to join California's porn underworld. His quest to rescue her takes him on an odyssey through this sleazy adult subculture.

With no results from Mast's investigations, the Los Angeles Police Department, or even from Los Angeles' sex shopkeepers and "rap parlor" women, a desperate Van Dorn posts an advertisement and disguise as a pornography producer in the Los Angeles Free Press, hoping to find information about his daughter. After many porn actors visit Van Dorn's motel, a scraggly actor named "Jism Jim", who was in the 8mm stag film with Kristen, appears and knows where she might be. Jim sends Van Dorn to an occasional porn actress and prostitute named Niki. Van Dorn hires Niki to accompany him on the search for Kristen. Chasing a rumor that Kristen was now filming porn in Mexico, their uneasy alliance moves from Los Angeles to San Diego, gradually warming to each other: Niki feels protected by Van Dorn because he is a man who does not see her as merely a sex object, and he is able to speak openly to her about his deepest feelings, such as his wife leaving him. The unlikely pair ends in San Francisco where Van Dorn finds that Kristen may be in the hands of Ratan, a very dangerous S & M porn player who deals in the world of "snuff films". Niki, who had previously begun to think Van Dorn could help her to escape life on the streets, now finds herself fearful of being forgotten once he locates his daughter — alive or dead. As a result, she initially refuses to divulge the address of a porn industry player who is a link to Ratan. Van Dorn loses his temper and strikes her to make her reveal the information.

Van Dorn finds the player named Tod, in a bondage house and forces Tod to tell him where Ratan hangs out. Van Dorn and Mast track Ratan to a nightclub where he and Kristen are observing a live sex show. When Van Dorn confronts Ratan, Kristen flees and Ratan slashes Van Dorn with a knife. Mast shoots and kills Ratan. Van Dorn tells Kristen he will take her home from the people he believes forced her into pornography. However, she responds with anger, stating that she entered porn of her own free will as a way to rebel against her conservative upbringing. She now felt loved and appreciated in a way that the emotionally distant Van Dorn never offered. Despondent and tearful, Van Dorn asks her if she really wants him to leave her alone but she acknowledges that she does not. As the two prepare to return home, Van Dorn spots Niki. He speaks to her, starting to make a token offer of gratitude, but it is clear to both that it is just as she feared. Her usefulness to him, and thus their relationship, is now over. She walks away, resigned to continuing her life on the streets.

Cast
 George C. Scott as Jake Van Dorn
 Peter Boyle as Andy Mast
 Season Hubley as Niki
 Dick Sargent as Wes DeJong
 Leonard Gaines as Bill Ramada
 Dave Nichols as Kurt (as David Nichols)
 Gary Graham as Tod (as Gary Rand Graham)
 Larry Block as Detective Burrows
 Marc Alaimo as Ratan
 Leslie Ackerman as Felice
 Charlotte McGinnis as Beatrice (as Charlotte McGinnes)
 Ilah Davis as Kristen Van Dorn
 Paul Marin as Joe Van Dorn
 Will Walker as Jim "Jism Jim" Sloan
 Hal Williams as Big Dick Blaque
 James Helder as John Van Dorn
 Reb Brown as Manager / Bouncer
 Tracey Walter as clerk in adult book store 
 W. K. Stratton as porn actor shooting night scene (uncredited)

Production
The film was produced by John Milius who said it was "a wonderful script that turned out to be a lousy movie. I blame Paul's direction for that."

Warren Beatty originally wanted to play the lead but, according to the director Paul Schrader, "He wouldn't take me as a director. And in his version, it would have been his wife, not his daughter, who split for the Coast. No good. I held out. I turned down a very large sum of money. I went after [George C.] Scott and I got him. One of the greatest actors in the world."

Reception
Despite arguing that the climax lapses into action film cliches, Roger Ebert nonetheless gave the movie a four-out-of-four star review for its "moments of pure revelation", particularly in the scenes between Scott and Hubley. Gene Siskel gave the film three-and-a-half stars out of four and called it "both a rich film of ideas and of strikingly real characters". He thought George C. Scott gave "one of his finest performances" in the film. Variety called it "a very good film" and predicted that no matter what each individual audience member's attitudes toward pornography and religion were, "nobody's going to be bored". Vincent Canby of The New York Times wrote in a mixed review that Schrader "demonstrates an extraordinary sensitivity to the realities of the American heritage that are seldom even thought about on screen, much less dramatized. His characters are complex. Unfortunately the melodrama seldom matches their complexity. It is blunt, clumsy—melodrama that seems not to reflect life but the ways lives are led in the movies."

Pauline Kael of The New Yorker was negative, explaining that Taxi Driver worked because "the protagonist, Travis Bickle, had a fear and hatred of sex so feverishly sensual that we experienced his tensions, his explosiveness. But in 'Hardcore' Jake feels no lust, so there's no enticement—and no contest. The Dutch Reformation Church has won the battle for his soul before the film's first frame." She added that "there something a little batty about the way Jake strides through hell swinging his fists, like a Calvinist John Wayne." Charles Champlin of the Los Angeles Times called the film "strong but finally disappointing stuff", explaining, "Quite apart from the plot concoctions that leave reality so far behind, the exasperation of 'Hardcore' is that the confrontation has never quite come off. The daughter, whose feelings are presumably crucial to an understanding of the story, is never more than a cipher and a symbol." Gary Arnold of The Washington Post called it "absorbing but unsatisfying", finding that the reconciliation at the end "violates too much of what we've been led to believe".

On Rotten Tomatoes, the film has an approval rating of 73% based on 26 reviews, with an average rating of 6.7/10. The site's consensus states: "Director Paul Schrader's preoccupations with alienation and faith are given a compelling avatar in George C. Scott's superb performance, although some audiences may find Hardcore too soft to live up to its provocative promise."

Home video release
Hardcore was available on VHS during the 1980s from Columbia Pictures Home Entertainment and later RCA/Columbia Pictures Home Video. In the 1990s, it was reissued on Columbia TriStar Home Video. In 2004, the film received a DVD release from Sony Pictures Home Entertainment.

In August 2016, the film received a U.S. release on Blu-ray from Twilight Time in a limited edition of 3,000 copies. The disc has a commentary track from Schrader as well as the critics Eddy Friedfeld, Lee Pfeiffer and Paul Scrabo. It is now available on streaming video and digital download through Amazon.com, Apple's iTunes Store, Vudu and other online media.

Awards and nominations

See also
 8mm
 List of media set in San Diego

References

External links
 

1979 films
1979 crime drama films
American crime drama films
American neo-noir films
Columbia Pictures films
1970s English-language films
Films about pornography
Films about prostitution in the United States
Films about runaways
Films about snuff films
Films directed by Paul Schrader
Films produced by Buzz Feitshans
Films scored by Jack Nitzsche
Films set in California
Films set in Los Angeles
Films set in Michigan
Films set in San Diego
Films set in San Francisco
Films shot in Los Angeles
Films shot in Michigan
Films shot in San Diego
Films shot in San Francisco
Films with screenplays by Paul Schrader
1970s American films
English-language drama films